Adolph Bernard Spreckels (January 5, 1857 – June 28, 1924) was a California businessman who ran Spreckels Sugar Company and who donated the California Palace of the Legion of Honor art museum to the city of San Francisco in 1924. His wife Alma was called the "great grandmother of San Francisco". His 1912 mansion is in Pacific Heights and is San Francisco Landmark #197.

Life and career 
Spreckels was born in San Francisco, California. His parents were Anna Christina Mangels and Claus Spreckels, founder of the Spreckels Sugar Company. At the age of 12, Adolph studied abroad in Hanover, Germany for two years, returning to San Francisco to finish his studies.

When the company was founded in 1881, he was named a vice-president. Spreckels succeeded his father as company president upon the latter's death in 1908. He was intensely loyal to both his father and his brother John. In 1884, he shot Michael H. de Young, co-founder of the San Francisco Chronicle, supposedly because of an article in that newspaper suggesting his sugar company defrauded its shareholders. Spreckels pleaded temporary insanity to the charge of attempted murder and was acquitted. The California Palace of the Legion of Honor was championed by his wife Alma and paid for from the Spreckels fortune. It was merged with the M. H. de Young Memorial Museum in 1972; they became the Fine Arts Museums of San Francisco.

Besides the sugar company, Spreckels was president of the San Francisco and San Mateo Electric Railway, vice-president of both the Western Sugar Company and the Oceanic Steamship Company, as well as a director of the Sunset Monarch Company. In addition to his business enterprises, Spreckels served as a San Francisco Park Commissioner and was heavily involved in the development of Golden Gate Park. Spreckels Lake, in the park, is named after him. Spreckels Organ Pavilion in San Diego's Balboa Park, housing the largest outdoor pipe organ in the world, was also built by Spreckels and his brother John. Furthermore, John commissioned Spreckels Organ in the Palace of the Legion of Honor in tribute to Adolph, who died before it was completed.

Thoroughbred racing
Spreckels was also fond of horse racing and owned and bred a number of race horses, most famously Morvich, the first California-bred horse to win the Kentucky Derby (1922).

Family
He and Alma de Bretteville were married on May 11, 1908, after a five-year courtship. They had three children, daughter Alma Emma, son Adolph Bernard, Jr., and another daughter, Dorothy Constance.

After the birth of their last daughter, Spreckels' health began to deteriorate due to syphilis he had contracted before his marriage. He had known about the disease and had kept it secret from his wife, but fortunately for her during their intimate years it had been in a latent, non-contagious state. Spreckels died in 1924 from pneumonia.

Spreckels Mansion 

The family's c.1912 mansion, located at 2080 Washington Street in the Pacific Heights neighborhood of San Francisco, is most recently the home of novelist Danielle Steel. The mansion was designed by George A. Applegarth and Kenneth A. MacDonald Jr. in the French Baroque style. The chateau was designated as San Francisco Landmark #197 on June 9, 1990.

References

Businesspeople from San Francisco
19th-century American businesspeople
Businesspeople in the sugar industry
American racehorse owners and breeders
Philanthropists from California
1857 births
1924 deaths
Deaths from pneumonia in California
People acquitted by reason of insanity